Dejah Monique Mulipola (born February 19, 1998) is a Polynesian American, former collegiate All-American softball catcher. She played college softball at Arizona from 2017 to 2021 where she was twice named a National Fastpitch Coaches Association First Team All-American. She has been a member of the United States women's national softball team since 2019 and helped them win a silver medal at the 2020 Summer Olympics. She most recently played in the Athletes Unlimited Softball where she won the 2022 championship as the top individual points leader.

Playing career

College career
Mulipola began her career for the Wildcats setting personal bests in hits, doubles while also leading the team in triples. On February 19, Mulipola used a double and home run to knock in a career best 6 RBIs to run-rule the Boston College Eagles. In a loss to the Utah Utes on April 14, she had a perfect day at the plate with four hits for another career highlight. As a sophomore Mulipola was named a Second Team All-Pac 12 performer, leading the team in triples, walks and fielding percentage. In a run-rule victory against the Texas Longhorns on March 4, Mulipola walked 3 times for another career high.

Mulipola achieved First Team All-Pac 12 and National Fastpitch Coaches Association All-American citations. She was also named NFCA Catcher of the Year. She had career highs in home runs and walks. Mulipola helped the Wildcats return to the 2019 Women's College World Series for the first time since 2010 before being eliminated by the Alabama Crimson Tide on May 31. She had two hits including a home run in three games at the series. 

In her redshirt senior season, Mulipola earned First Team honors from the conference and NFCA. She was also named a finalist for the Honda Softball Award. She set career highs in batting average, runs batted in and slugging percentage. On February 25, Mulipola hit her 50th career home run, a grand slam off Reggie Kanagawa to run-rule the BYU Cougars. From April 18–May 8 she had her best hitting streak at 10 consecutive games. She hit .428 (12/28) with 9 RBIs, two home runs, three doubles and 4 walks before being shutout by the Oregon Ducks. On May 22 to defeat the Mississippi Rebels, she became the 12th wildcat to join the 50 home run 200 RBI list by collecting 5 RBIs to reach the 200 milestone. Mulipola made her final collegiate appearance in a loss to the Florida State Seminoles on June 5 at the 2021 Women's College World Series and managed only a walk. Mulipola currently ranks as the second best fielding catcher and overall player for the Wildcats in school history with a .996 fielding percentage.

Professional career
Mulipola was drafted fourth overall in the Athletes Unlimited Softball draft. She won the 2022 championship as the top individual points leader with 1,782 points.

Team USA
Mulipola returned to Arizona for the 2021 season, after missing the 2020 season due to the Stand Beside Her Tour with USA Softball in preparation for the 2020 Summer Olympics. At the Olympics, Mulipola played in one game collecting a hit and walk. Mulipola did not play in the gold medal game, where Team USA was defeated by Team Japan 2–0.

Statistics

References

External Links

dejah Mulipola on Telegram 

1998 births
Living people
Arizona Wildcats softball players
Softball players from California
People from Garden Grove, California
Pan American Games medalists in softball
Pan American Games gold medalists for the United States
Softball players at the 2019 Pan American Games
Medalists at the 2019 Pan American Games
Medalists at the 2020 Summer Olympics
Olympic silver medalists for the United States in softball
Olympic medalists in softball
Olympic softball players of the United States
Softball players at the 2020 Summer Olympics
Competitors at the 2022 World Games
World Games gold medalists
World Games medalists in softball